Sharon Kikini Firisua (born 15 December 1993) is a Solomon Islands track and field athlete. At the 2016 Summer Olympics she competed in the 5000 m event. At the 2020 Summer Olympics, she competed in the Women's marathon.

Career 
In 2013 she was named the Solomon Islands Sportswoman of the Year. She started training seriously in 2010 and at her second Pacific Games in 2015 she took two gold medals at 5000 and 10,000m and another in the half marathon in Port Moresby, Papua New Guinea.

References

External links
 

1993 births
Living people
Solomon Islands female steeplechase runners
Solomon Islands female long-distance runners
Olympic athletes of the Solomon Islands
Athletes (track and field) at the 2016 Summer Olympics
Athletes (track and field) at the 2020 Summer Olympics
Commonwealth Games competitors for the Solomon Islands
Athletes (track and field) at the 2014 Commonwealth Games
Athletes (track and field) at the 2018 Commonwealth Games
People from Malaita Province